Percy Cooke Kimberley (8 January 1878 – 10 December 1949) was an Australian rules footballer who played with Fitzroy in the Victorian Football League (VFL).

Sources

Holmesby, Russell & Main, Jim (2009). The Encyclopedia of AFL Footballers. 8th ed. Melbourne: Bas Publishing.

1878 births
1949 deaths
Fitzroy Football Club players
Australian rules footballers from Melbourne
People from Collingwood, Victoria